Scott Carter is an Australian former rugby league footballer who played in the 1980s and 1990s.

As a player, Carter was part of the inaugural Newcastle Knights squad from 1988–91. He played for Country Origin in 1990, and London Crusaders in England.

References

External links
Statistics at rugbyleagueproject.org

Living people
Australian rugby league players
Country New South Wales Origin rugby league team players
London Broncos players
Newcastle Knights players
Rugby league hookers
Year of birth missing (living people)